Robert Wilkinson Furnas (May 5, 1824June 1, 1905) was the second governor of Nebraska. Born near Troy, Ohio, and orphaned at the age of eight Furnas was a self-made man. He worked as a farmer, printer, tinsmith, insurance salesman, and postmaster all before getting into politics. He married Mary Elizabeth McComas on October 29, 1845, who died in 1897; and his second was Susannah Emswiler Jameson.  He had eight children.

Career
Furnas came to Nebraska in 1856 at the age of thirty-two and settled in Brownville, Nebraska. Two months later, he published the Nebraska Advertiser, a publication advertising the agricultural opportunities found in Nebraska. He also published the Nebraska Farmer, the first agricultural publication out of Nebraska that is still published to this day.

In 1856 and 1858, Furnas was elected to the Legislative Assembly of Nebraska Territory. He served as the public printer for the Nebraska Territory in 1857. In 1861, he was the chief clerk of the Territorial Council.

Civil War
During the Civil War, Furnas became a colonel in the territorial militia, which was loyal to the Union. In 1862, he commanded three Indian regiments aligned with the Union Army and captured the Cherokee Indian chief John Ross.

Postbellum career
After the war, Furnas served as Indian agent for the Omaha, Winnebago, and Ponca tribes. He was a member of the University of Nebraska board of regents from 1869 to 1875,  first president of the Nebraska State Historical Society from 1878 to 1890, United States commissioner to the Philadelphia Centennial Exposition, United States Commissioner to the New Orleans Cotton Centennial and United States commissioner to the Chicago Columbian Exposition.

Furnas served as president of the American Fair Association, president of the State Horticultural Society, Fourth Grand Master of Masons of Nebraska AF&AM from 1865 to 1866, first president of the Nebraska Teachers Association and president of the State Board of Agriculture. He served as secretary of the State Board of Agriculture from the early 1880s until his death.

Furnas secured the Republican nomination, and was elected governor by popular vote. He served as Governor of Nebraska from 1873 to 1875.

Death
Furnas died in 1905 and is interred in Walnut Grove Cemetery in Brownville, Nebraska.

Legacy
Furnas helped to create Arbor Day when he was governor.

Furnas County, Nebraska, is named in his honor.

He was inducted to the Nebraska Hall of Fame in 1979-1980.

References

Further reading
  This site allows users the ability to read all of the issues of the Nebraska Advertiser as they were published, in PDF format, and view the associated images. Robert Wilkinson Furnas acted as editor over all issues of the magazine from 1856 until his death in 1875.

External links
 
  at the Nebraska State Historical Society
 Nebraska Governor Robert Wilkinson Furnas at the National Governors Association
 
 

1824 births
1905 deaths
People from Troy, Ohio
Members of the Nebraska Territorial Legislature
19th-century American politicians
Republican Party governors of Nebraska
United States Indian agents
People of Nebraska in the American Civil War
American male journalists
People from Brownville, Nebraska
Union Army colonels